The third season of the Chinese reality talent show The Voice of China premiered on 18 July 2014 on Zhejiang Television. Hu Qiaohua returned as host. Na Ying and Wang Feng returned as coaches. A-mei and Harlem Yu did not return for season three, making room for the return of Yang Kun after a one-season absence, and an addition of a new coach, Chyi Chin. On 7 October 2014, Zhang Bichen of Team Na Ying was announced as the winner of the season, making her the first female winner of The Voice of China. Perhat Khaliq of Team Wang Feng, Ryan Yu of Team Yang Kun, and UZ Qin of Team Chyi Chin finished runner-up, third, and fourth places respectively.

Changes from the previous seasons 
This year's Blind Auditions were filmed outside Shanghai, where the two previous seasons were recorded. The number of members on each coach's team was increased to 16 from 14 in previous seasons. In addition, the "Steal" option introduced in Season 2 was removed from the Battle Rounds format.

One major change this year is that the show also allowed entries from street auditions in more than 100 cities in China. Several entries from street auditions passed through pre-show eliminations and made their way to the Blind Auditions.

Teams
 Colour key

Blind auditions

Colour key

Episode 1 (18 July)

Episode 2 (25 July)

Episode 3 (1 August)

Episode 4 (8 August)

Episode 5 (15 August)

 - Na Ying pressed Wang Feng's button.

Episode 6 (22 August)
After the revival round, Chyi Chin's team still had one vacant position left. After discussion by the four coaches and directors, they decided to have an Overtime Round, in which those who were unsuccessful in the revival round got a chance to sing for Chyi Chin and he would decide if he wanted the contestant to join his team.

Episode 9 (12 September)
Originally there were 16 contestants in Yang Kun's group, but Aisin-Gioro Mei was refused and her performance was not broadcast in the show as she was only 14 years old. The vacant position was decided to be given to Liang Dongjiang.

The Battles
Coaches began narrowing down the playing field by training the contestants with the help of a "Dream Coach" ("Trusted Advisor" in all versions in English-speaking countries). Each episode features pairings from within a coach's team, and each battle concludes with the respective coach reducing his or her team from 16 to the top 4.

The format of the Battle Rounds is divided into two stages, the Battle Stage and the Sing-Off Stage. In the Battle Stage, each pairing jointly performs the same song, after which the 3 other coaches and the "Dream Coach" give their opinions. The main coach selects one of the pair to advance to the Sing-Off Stage. In the Sing-Off Stage, the top 8 singers are randomly paired and each performs a solo song, after which the main coach selects one of the pair to advance to the Team Championship Rounds.

Season three's advisors are Karen Mok and Chyi Yu (assistant coach) for Team Chyi Chin, Zheng Jun for Team Wang Feng, Jeff Chang for Team Na Ying and Jam Hsiao for Team Yang Kun.

Colour key

The Knockouts
Colour key

Coach Appreciation Night (Episode 11)
This episode was first broadcast on September 21, 2014. In this episode, all 16 contestants performed the song 《火》 (Fire), and then each of the contestants performed part of the song that they sang during the blind auditions to thank the coaches.

The Playoffs
There are two rounds in this stage. In the first round, the four contestants are randomly paired up, and the coach decides on the contestant to advance to the next round. In the second round, the two remaining contestants compete against each other, and the votes are decided by the media as well as the coach, who gives a total of 100 points for both contestants. The contestant with the highest number of votes is the team champion.

Round 1

Round 2

Final Battle Concert (Episode 14)
This episode was first broadcast at 21:10 (UTC+8, 14:10 in London, 9:10 in Eastern USA) on October 1, 2014. The final battle concert was held in Macau.

Live show

Episode 15: Finals (7 October)
This episode was first broadcast at 20:00 (UTC+8, 13:00 in London, 8:00 in Eastern USA) on October 7, 2014. The final concert was held in Capital Indoor Stadium, Beijing. Zhang Bichen was named the winner.

Artists' appearances on earlier seasons or other talent shows 
 Li Man sang in the blind auditions and revival round for season one, but both failed to turn any chairs. Both performances were not broadcast on television, but on http://v.qq.com/cover/b/brya6a9oh56w2dc/e00156bxylw.html.
 Mark Chang and Rose Liu appeared on the fourth season and the fifth season of One Million Star, and both of them finished in the second place.
 Eve Ai and UZ Qin appeared on the first season and the fifth season of Super Idol  as a challenger in the Challenging Round respectively. Ai also participated in the fifth season of Super Idol as a contestant, and went on to become the winner of the show.
 Cheng Shin-ci and Wendy Woo appeared on the second season and the third season of Chinese Million Star, and finished in the second and fifth place respectively.
 Tang Siu Hau appeared on the first season of The Voice, the singing competition from TVB, and finished in the sixth place.

Ratings

The data determined by CSM.

International broadcast

Singapore 
In Singapore, the Singaporean audition shows were aired at 20:00 on July 10 and 17, 2014; the first episode aired at 19:00 on July 19, 2014. All the subsequent shows will be aired every Saturday. All shows above aired at MediaCorp Channel 8. Using the Toggle app, viewers in Singapore can watch the show exactly the same time Zhejiang TV broadcast for the first time (21:10 every Friday).

The 4th episode was postponed to 22:30 on August 9, 2014 due to the Singapore National Day Parade.

Malaysia 
In Malaysia, the Malaysian qualification shows were aired at 22:30 on July 5 and 12, 2014; the regular episodes will be aired every Saturday, starting from July 19, 2014 at 8TV.

Hong Kong 
In Hong Kong, the first episode aired at 21:10 on July 18, 2014 at now Hong Kong. The first episode aired at 13:15 on August 24, 2014 at HD Jade.

Taiwan 
In Taiwan, the first episode aired at 20:00 on September 13, 2014 at CTi Variety.

References

Season 3
2014 Chinese television seasons